Pediasia sajanella is a moth in the family Crambidae. It was described by Aristide Caradja in 1925. It is found in Central Asia (Sajan, Arasagungol).

References

Crambini
Moths described in 1925
Moths of Asia